Dame Anna Evelyn Hamilton Pauffley DBE (born 13 January 1956), styled The Hon. Mrs Justice Pauffley, was a judge of the High Court of England and Wales. until her retirement on 1 October 2017.

She was educated at Godolphin School and the University of London.

She was called to the bar at Middle Temple in 1979. In 2003, she was appointed a judge of the High Court of Justice (Family Division). She retired from the bench in October 2017.

Controversies

Accommodating child abuse
On 11 June 2015 Pauffley was highly criticised by ministers and child protection campaigners for stating that it was 'okay for migrant families to hit children', suggesting that migrants could hit children because of so-called 'culture context', in response a government spokesman stated that there should never be any exceptions regarding child abuse.

References

1956 births
Living people
People educated at Godolphin School
Alumni of the University of London
Members of the Middle Temple
Family Division judges
English women judges